Pseudoopsis humerosus is a species of beetle in the family Cerambycidae, and the only species in the genus Pseudoopsis. It was described by Breuning in 1956.

References

Apomecynini
Beetles described in 1956
Monotypic beetle genera